Khaled Korbi (born 16 December 1985) is a retired Tunisian professional footballer who plays as a central midfielder.

Club career
On June 6, 2012, Korbi joined Qatar Stars League club Al-Sailiya, signing a two-year contract with the club. On December 22, he reached a mutual agreement with the club to terminate his contract.

References

External links

1985 births
Living people
Tunisian footballers
2010 Africa Cup of Nations players
2011 African Nations Championship players
MS Manouba players
Stade Tunisien players
Espérance Sportive de Tunis players
2012 Africa Cup of Nations players
Expatriate footballers in Qatar
Al-Sailiya SC players
Al-Wakrah SC players
Club Africain
Raja CA players
Tunisian expatriate footballers
Footballers from Tunis
Association football midfielders
Tunisia international footballers
Tunisia A' international footballers